Emilia Nielsen is a Canadian writer and academic. An associate professor in the faculty of social sciences at York University, she has published both poetry and academic literature on the sociological aspects of health and disability.

In 2014, her debut poetry collection Surge Narrows was shortlisted for the Gerald Lampert Award, and in 2019, her second poetry collection Body Work was shortlisted for the Pat Lowther Award and the Lambda Literary Award for Lesbian Poetry. Her first academic work, Disrupting Breast Cancer Narratives: Stories of Rage and Repair, was published by University of Toronto Press in 2019.

Her academic writing has also appeared in scholarly journals such as Canadian Woman Studies, Performance Research and Disability Studies Quarterly, and her creative writing has appeared in Plenitude, The Antigonish Review, Contemporary Verse 2, Descant, The Fiddlehead, Grain, Prairie Fire and Room.

References

External links

21st-century Canadian poets
21st-century Canadian non-fiction writers
21st-century Canadian women writers
Canadian women poets
Canadian women non-fiction writers
Canadian women academics
Canadian sociologists
Medical sociologists
Disability studies academics
Canadian LGBT poets
Academic staff of York University
Living people
Year of birth missing (living people)
Canadian women sociologists
21st-century Canadian LGBT people